Brethren in Christ Church Society is a Protestant denomination of India, founded by James Ard. It is focused on Bihar. It is limited to states in the east of India. The church has thousands of members. Several dozens of parishes are within the church. They are part of the Brethren in Christ Church, a Mennonite group.

Sources

Religion in Bihar
Churches in India